Ayas Mehmed Pasha (1483–1539) was an Ottoman statesman and grand vizier of the Ottoman Empire from 1536 to 1539. He was an Albanian born in Delvinë (Sanjak of Avlona). His father was from the city of Shkodra, in the north of Albania, and his mother was from Vlorë, in the south of Albania. He went to Istanbul while his father was living there, and following his orders entered Ottoman service under the Devshirme practice (as he was born Christian) and eventually became Agha of the Janissaries. He participated in the Battle of Chaldiran (1514) and the Ottoman–Mamluk War (1516–17). During 1520–1521 he was beylerbey of Anatolia Eyalet and governor of Damascus. During the reign of Suleiman the Magnificent, he served as beylerbey of Rumelia Eyalet and was made a vizier after the Ottoman conquest of Rhodes in 1522. He also participated in the Battle of Mohács, Siege of Vienna, and the war in Iraq (1534–1535).

He became grand vizier in 1536 after the execution of Pargalı Ibrahim Pasha and kept this position until his death in 1539. Under his administration, the Ottomans undertook the Corfu campaign (1537) and waged war against the Habsburgs in Vienna (1537–1540). Additionally, his native Vlorë region was put under full Ottoman control, and the Sanjak of Delvina was created. He died of plague in Istanbul and was buried in the Eyüp Sultan Mosque.

Depictions in literature and popular culture
In the TV series Muhteşem Yüzyıl, Ayas Mehmed Pasha is played by Turkish actor Fehmi Karaarslan.

See also
 List of Ottoman Grand Viziers

References 

16th-century Grand Viziers of the Ottoman Empire
16th-century Albanian people
Albanian Grand Viziers of the Ottoman Empire
Year of death unknown
Devshirme
Grand Viziers of Suleiman the Magnificent
Albanians from the Ottoman Empire
Year of birth unknown
1483 births
1539 deaths
People from Himara
Ottoman governors of Damascus